Siniger Nunatak (‘Nunatak Siniger’ \'nu-na-tak si-'ni-ger\) is the rocky hill rising to 647 m in the upper course of Russell East Glacier on Trinity Peninsula in Graham Land, Antarctica.

The nunatak is named after the settlement of Siniger in Southern Bulgaria.

Location
German-British mapping in 1996.

Maps
 Trinity Peninsula. Scale 1:250000 topographic map No. 5697. Institut für Angewandte Geodäsie and British Antarctic Survey, 1996.
 Antarctic Digital Database (ADD). Scale 1:250000 topographic map of Antarctica. Scientific Committee on Antarctic Research (SCAR). Since 1993, regularly updated.

Notes

References
 Siniger Nunatak. SCAR Composite Antarctic Gazetteer
 Bulgarian Antarctic Gazetteer. Antarctic Place-names Commission. (details in Bulgarian, basic data in English)

External links
 Siniger Nunatak. Copernix satellite image

Nunataks of Trinity Peninsula
Bulgaria and the Antarctic